Cristoforo Colombo (Christopher Columbus) is an opera in four acts and an epilogue by Alberto Franchetti to an Italian libretto by Luigi Illica. It was written in 1892 to commemorate the 400th anniversary of Christopher Columbus' arrival in America.

Commissioned by the city of Genoa, Columbus' birthplace, the opera deals with the voyage of discovery, its opposition by the Spanish authorities, Columbus' encouragement by Queen Isabella, and finally, after his difficulties and triumph, his anguish when he learns of her death.

An essentially melodic opera only tangentially influenced by the emerging verismo style, it is harmonically rich, with obvious references to the work of Richard Wagner and Meyerbeer. The act 2 monologue contains a Rhine-like motif; after cries of Terra! Terra! the orchestra replies with Tristan-like ecstasy, and then a rainbow bridge-like triumph. Its anti-church elements have been noted, particularly in the opera's earlier versions: it is the clerics who oppose the voyage initially, and who violently attempt to evangelise the South American natives.

Performance history
The opera premiered at Genoa's Teatro Carlo Felice on 6 October 1892 conducted by Luigi Mancinelli with sets designed by Ugo Gheduzzi and costumes by Adolfo Hohenstein. The same year, it was performed in a revised version at La Scala, Milan. It had a number of performances throughout Italy, many of them conducted by Arturo Toscanini, and in Buenos Aires. The opera's North American premiere was presented by the Philadelphia-Chicago Grand Opera Company at the Philadelphia Metropolitan Opera House on November 20, 1913, with Titta Ruffo in the title role, Rosa Raisa as Queen Isabella of Spain, Amedeo Bassi as Don Fernan Guevara, and Gustave Huberdeau as Don Roldano Ximenes.

Despite initial stage success, a massive cut of the first version, of some 100 pages of orchestral score, led to the published version; a set of adventures in America in acts 3 and 4 having been considered too long.  The final version of 1923 contained three acts, omitting the American content altogether, although containing much of its music. One of Luigi Illica's first librettos, it had a difficult gestation due to difficulties with the composer. Illica withdrew his name from the project after the first performance.

Roles

Selected recordings

Individual arias
Titta Ruffo Edition: Two arias from act 2 of the opera: "Aman lassù le stelle" (Strange loves have the stars on high) and "Dunque ho sognato?" (Is it a dream?) (Preiser Records 89303)
Complete opera 
Cristoforo Colombo Renato Bruson (baritone); Roberto Scandiuzzi (bass); Rosella Ragatzu (soprano); Gisella Pasino (mezzo-soprano); Marco Berti (tenor); Hungarian Radio Chorus, Budapest, Frankfurt Radio Symphony Orchestra. Conductor: Marcello Viotti. (Koch Schwann 367392)

References

Further reading
 George Jellinek, History Through the Opera Glass, Kahn & Averill, 1994. 
 Gustav Kobbé, The Complete Opera Book (1919 edition), G. P. Putnam.
 Jürgen Maehder and Antonio Rostagno, "Franchetti, Baron Alberto" in The New Grove Dictionary of Music and Musicians, Stanley Sadie and  John Tyrrell (eds), 2001.
 Mercedes Viale Ferrero, La visione scenica di Cristoforo Colombo (in Italian). Accessed 14 May 2008.

External links
 Cristoforo Colombo – section on the official Alberto Franchetti web site (in Italian).
 Libretto of Cristoforo Colombo in Italian on operalibretto.com
 Discography of Franchetti's Cristoforo Colombo – including live and unofficial recordings (in German).
 

Italian-language operas
Verismo operas
Operas
Operas by Alberto Franchetti
1892 operas
Cultural depictions of Christopher Columbus
Cultural depictions of Isabella I of Castile
Fiction set in 1492
Operas set in the 15th century
Operas set in Spain
Operas set in South America